Tomasz Abramowicz (born 15 February 1979 in Ełk) is a Polish footballer who currently plays as a midfielder or forward for Victoria Czermin.

Football career 
Abramowicz began his career as a trainee with Stal Mielec. He made his Ekstraklasa debut on 6 April 1996 as a substitute in a 2–0 defeat against Pogoń Szczecin and scored his first goal on 15 May in a match against GKS Bełchatów. Abramowicz ended the 1995–96 season with one goal in seven league appearances. But Stal finished 17th and were relegated to II liga (second league). After the 1996–97 season Abramowicz moved to Zagłębie Sosnowiec.

Later he played for various clubs from lower divisions and other countries, including Sokół Nisko, Pogoń Leżajsk, Polonia Stanford, AKS Busko Zdrój, Wisłoka Dębica and Kolubszowianka Kolubszowa. In August 2010 he moved to Start Wola Mielecka.

In 2011, he joined the liga okręgowa side Victoria Czermin.

References 

1979 births
Living people
People from Ełk
Polish footballers
Polish expatriate footballers
Association football midfielders
Association football forwards
Stal Mielec players
Sokół Nisko players
Ekstraklasa players
Expatriate soccer players in the United States
Polish expatriate sportspeople in the United States
Sportspeople from Warmian-Masurian Voivodeship